Valeri Ivanovich Nichushkin (born March 4, 1995) is a Russian professional ice hockey right winger who currently plays for the Colorado Avalanche of the National Hockey League (NHL). Nickname "Big Val" and "Nuke", He was selected by the Dallas Stars in the first round, 10th overall, of the 2013 NHL Entry Draft. Nichushkin won the Stanley Cup with the Avalanche in 2022.

Playing career

KHL
After one season in the Kontinental Hockey League (KHL), Nichushkin transferred from Traktor Chelyabinsk to Dynamo Moscow on May 1, 2013. He then signed a two-year contract with Dynamo. However, the deal was terminated conditionally, allowing Nichushkin to play in the NHL, or be returned to Dynamo if he failed to make the NHL team.

NHL

Dallas Stars
Nichushkin played his first regular season NHL game on October 3, 2013, against the Florida Panthers. He scored his first career NHL goal on November 3, 2013, against Craig Anderson of the Ottawa Senators.

Following a strong rookie season, registering 14 goals and 20 assists, Nichushkin suffered from hip and groin soreness in the beginning of his sophomore campaign, 2014–15. Five games into the season, Nichushkin opted for hip surgery, which was performed on November 18, 2014. He rehabbed in New Jersey and re-joined the team in March 2015, practicing in a red no-contact jersey.

As a restricted free agent following the conclusion of his entry-level deal in the 2015–16 season, Nichushkin and the Stars failed to agree to common grounds in contract negotiations. Unhappy with his current role within the Stars line-up, his KHL rights were traded from Dynamo Moscow to CSKA Moscow on September 20, 2016. He subsequently signed a two-year contract to return to the KHL with CSKA, with his NHL rights to be kept by the Stars.

After two seasons with CSKA, Nichushkin returned to the Stars organization, in agreeing to a two-year, $5.9 million contract on July 1, 2018. In his return to the Stars in the 2018–19 season, Nichushkin recorded 10 assists in 54 regular-season games, averaging 11:55 time on ice per game. Nichushkin skated in one game during the playoffs with the Stars and failed to record a point.

After a disappointing 2018-19 campaign, failing to score a goal through 57 games, Nichushkin was placed on unconditional waivers by the Stars and subsequently bought out from the remaining year of his contract with the team on 30 June 2019.

Colorado Avalanche
Nichushkin signed a one-year, $850k contract with the Colorado Avalanche on August 19, 2019. Nichushkin scored his first goal in 2 years on November 23, 2019. In his first season with the Avalanche, generally perceived to be a successful one, Nichushkin especially received high praise from many hockey analytics proponents for his high rankings in many metrics, especially defensive metrics.  Nichushkin finished the 2019-20 season with 13 goals and 27 points while leading all forwards in the NHL in defensive Goals Above Replacement. Such strong defensive play helped Nichushkin to receive votes for the Frank J. Selke Trophy, the award given to the best defensive forward in the NHL, finishing 8th in voting.

On October 10, 2020, the Avalanche re-signed Nichushkin, who was a restricted free agent, to a 2-year, $5 million contract extension.

In his third season with Avalanche, Nichushkin elevated in a top-six forward role, scored a career-best 52 points in 62 games, adding 15 points in 20 playoff games. He placed third on the team with 9 playoff goals to help the Avalanche claim their first Stanley Cup in 21 years.

On July 11, 2022, Nichushkin signed an eight-year, $49 million extension to stay with the Avalanche.

Career statistics

Regular season and playoffs

International

Awards and honours

References

External links

1995 births
Living people
Belye Medvedi Chelyabinsk players
HC CSKA Moscow players
Colorado Avalanche players
Dallas Stars draft picks
Dallas Stars players
Ice hockey players at the 2014 Winter Olympics
National Hockey League first-round draft picks
Olympic ice hockey players of Russia
Russian expatriate ice hockey people
Russian expatriate sportspeople in the United States
Russian ice hockey right wingers
Sportspeople from Chelyabinsk
Stanley Cup champions
Texas Stars players
Traktor Chelyabinsk players